Synodontis carineae is a species of upside-down catfish endemic to the Republic of the Congo, where it is only known from the Kouilou-Niari basin. This species grows to a length of  SL.

References

Further reading

External links 

Endemic fauna of the Republic of the Congo
carineae
Taxa named by Emmanuel J. Vreven
Taxa named by Armel Ibala Zamba
Catfish of Africa
Fish of the Republic of the Congo
Endemic fauna of the Democratic Republic of the Congo
Fish described in 2011